Anne-Sophie Lapix (born 29 April 1972 in Saint-Jean-de-Luz, Pyrénées-Atlantiques) is a French journalist and television presenter mainly for the French news program on France 2. She used to deputise for Claire Chazal, presenting the evening news bulletin (20 Heures) on France 2 from Friday to Sunday as well as the lunchtime bulletin at 1 PM (13 Heures). She also presented the Sunday evening magazine program Sept à Huit with Harry Roselmack (who used to substitute for TF1 newsreader Patrick Poivre d'Arvor.)

After gaining a degree from the IEP of Bordeaux, Lapix has worked for Bloomberg, LCI and M6 where she has presented French leading newsmagazine Zone Interdite before joining TF1's staff. She hosted C à vous from 2013 to 2017.

Personal life
Lapix is married to Arthur Sadoun, CEO of the advertising agency Publicis. She has two children from a previous relationship.

References

1972 births
Living people
People from Saint-Jean-de-Luz
French women journalists
French television journalists
French television presenters
French women television presenters
French-Basque people